Re Sarflax Ltd [1979] Ch 592; [1979] 1 All E.R. 529 is a UK insolvency law case concerning voidable preferences and fraudulent trading, now in the Insolvency Act 1986. It concerns the definition of "intention to defraud", which is found in a number of legal provisions.

Facts

Sarflax Ltd was in liquidation. It incurred another debt after a judgment that it had delivered unsatisfactory goods. The liquidator moved for a declaration that the delivery of these unsatisfactory goods was evidence of fraudulent trading.

Judgment
Oliver J held that "intention to defraud" in the voidable preference section (now Insolvency Act 1986, section 239) did not cover a case where a debtor merely knew or had grounds to think he had no sufficient funds to pay creditors in full.

See also
R v. Grantham [1984] QB 675
Re Augustus Barnett & Son Ltd [1986] BCLC 170
Re a Company (No 001418 of 1988) [1990] BCC 526

References
Gary Scanlan (2003) Company Lawyer 234

United Kingdom insolvency case law
High Court of Justice cases
1979 in British law
1979 in case law